Valerie Ivy "Val" Buffham-Norris (born 28 June 1943) is a retired Australian gymnast. She competed at the 1964 and 1968 Olympics in all artistic gymnastics events and finished in 10th place with the Australian team in 1964. Her best individual result was 58th place on the vault in 1968.

References

External links
 
 

1943 births
Living people
Australian female artistic gymnasts
Olympic gymnasts of Australia
Gymnasts at the 1964 Summer Olympics
Gymnasts at the 1968 Summer Olympics
20th-century Australian women